Bidco United Football Club is an association football club based in Thika, Kenya. The club currently competes in the Kenyan Premier League, and currently plays its home games at the Del Monte Grounds and is sponsored by Bidco Africa.

References

External links 
MichezoAfrika.com
Calciozz.it

Kenyan National Super League clubs
FKF Division One clubs
Football clubs in Kenya